Hormozgan's codes are 84 and 94. In public cars, Taxis and Governal cars the letter is always the same. But in simple cars this letter (ب) depends on the city.

84
18 is Bandarabbas county and Khamir County's code and all of the letters are for Bandarabbas.

94

Road transport in Iran
Transportation in Hormozgan Province